Constantin Staib (born 31 August 1995) is a German field hockey player who plays as a midfielder or forward for Hamburger Polo Club and the German national team.

Club career
Constantin Staib plays as a forward for German club Hamburger Polo Club. Prior to his move to Hamburger Polo Club, Staib played for Club an der Alster until 2018.

International career
In 2015, Staib made his international debut for Germany in a test match against South Africa in Cape Town. In the same year, he won his first medal with Germany at the EuroHockey Nations Championship in London, finishing in second place.

Since his debut, Staib has been a regular inclusion in the national team, most notably winning bronze at the 2016 Champions Trophy. Staib's most recent appearance for Germany was during the inaugural FIH Pro League in 2019. On 28 May 2021, he was named in the squad for the 2021 EuroHockey Championship and the 2020 Summer Olympics.

References

External links
 

1995 births
Living people
Sportspeople from Münster
German male field hockey players
Male field hockey forwards
Male field hockey midfielders
Der Club an der Alster players
Field hockey players at the 2020 Summer Olympics
Olympic field hockey players of Germany
21st-century German people